Mawlay al-Yazid bin Mohammed, born on 6 May 1750 in Fes and died on 23 February 1792 near Zagora, was a Sultan of Morocco from 1790 to 1792, a ruler of the 'Alawi dynasty. He was proclaimed sultan after the death of his father Mohammed bin Abdallah.

Reign 
Mawlay al-Yazid was born in Fes in 1750. al-Yazid's first order of business was persecuting the Jews of the city of Tétouan.  In deference to Yazid's father, Sultan Mohammed ben Abdallah, the Jews of Tétouan denied financial support to Yazid and his effort to overthrow his father.  Observers remarked that Yazid authorized his black troops to plunder Tétouan's Jewish quarter. For two years, the country was thrown into turmoil. Mawlay al-Yazid attempted to undo the innovations instituted by his father, dismantling much of his father's system.

See also
 List of Sultans of Morocco
 History of Morocco
 'Alawi dynasty

References

 History of Morocco
 

1750 births
1792 deaths
People from Fez, Morocco
18th-century Islamic religious leaders
18th-century Moroccan people
18th-century monarchs in Africa
'Alawi dynasty monarchs